The 1970–71 New York Knicks season was the 25th season for the team in the National Basketball Association (NBA). New York entered the season as the defending NBA champions, having defeated the Los Angeles Lakers in the 1970 NBA Finals in seven games to win the first championship in franchise history. In the 1970–71 regular season, the Knicks finished in first place in the Atlantic Division with a 52–30 record, and qualified for the NBA Playoffs for the fifth consecutive year.

New York began its NBA title defense with a 4–1 series victory over the Atlanta Hawks in the first round of the 1971 NBA Playoffs. In the Eastern Conference Finals, the Baltimore Bullets defeated the Knicks in seven games, ending the team's chances for a repeat championship.

Draft picks

Note: This is not an extensive list; it only covers the first and second rounds, and any other players picked by the franchise that played at least one game in the league.

Roster

Regular season

Season standings

z – clinched division title
y – clinched division title
x – clinched playoff spot

Record vs. opponents

Game log

Playoffs

|- align="center" bgcolor="#ccffcc"
| 1
| March 25
| Atlanta
| W 112–101
| Bill Bradley (25)
| Willis Reed (22)
| Bill Bradley (4)
| Madison Square Garden19,500
| 1–0
|- align="center" bgcolor="#ffcccc"
| 2
| March 27
| Atlanta
| L 104–113
| Walt Frazier (29)
| Dave DeBusschere (15)
| Bill Bradley (4)
| Madison Square Garden19,500
| 1–1
|- align="center" bgcolor="#ccffcc"
| 3
| March 28
| @ Atlanta
| W 110–95
| Willis Reed (26)
| Dave DeBusschere (17)
| Walt Frazier (9)
| Alexander Memorial Coliseum7,192
| 2–1
|- align="center" bgcolor="#ccffcc"
| 4
| March 30
| @ Atlanta
| W 113–107
| Walt Frazier (26)
| Dave DeBusschere (13)
| Walt Frazier (8)
| Alexander Memorial Coliseum7,192
| 3–1
|- align="center" bgcolor="#ccffcc"
| 5
| April 1
| Atlanta
| W 111–107
| Dave DeBusschere (29)
| Dave DeBusschere (22)
| Willis Reed (5)
| Madison Square Garden19,500
| 4–1
|-

|- align="center" bgcolor="#ccffcc"
| 1
| April 6
| Baltimore
| W 112–111
| Walt Frazier (24)
| Dave DeBusschere (17)
| Walt Frazier (7)
| Madison Square Garden19,500
| 1–0
|- align="center" bgcolor="#ccffcc"
| 2
| April 9
| Baltimore
| W 107–88
| Dick Barnett (14)
| Dave DeBusschere (14)
| Walt Frazier (5)
| Madison Square Garden19,500
| 2–0
|- align="center" bgcolor="#ffcccc"
| 3
| April 11
| @ Baltimore
| L 88–114
| Walt Frazier (17)
| Willis Reed (10)
| Barnett, Bradley (5)
| Baltimore Civic Center8,083
| 2–1
|- align="center" bgcolor="#ffcccc"
| 4
| April 14
| @ Baltimore
| L 80–101
| Walt Frazier (16)
| Dave DeBusschere (9)
| Walt Frazier (5)
| Baltimore Civic Center12,289
| 2–2
|- align="center" bgcolor="#ccffcc"
| 5
| April 16
| Baltimore
| W 89–84
| Walt Frazier (28)
| Dave DeBusschere (17)
| Bill Bradley (4)
| Madison Square Garden19,500
| 3–2
|- align="center" bgcolor="#ffcccc"
| 6
| April 18
| @ Baltimore
| L 96–113
| Dave DeBusschere (24)
| Dave DeBusschere (10)
| Dick Barnett (5)
| Baltimore Civic Center11,211
| 3–3
|- align="center" bgcolor="#ffcccc"
| 7
| April 19
| Baltimore
| L 91–93
| Dick Barnett (26)
| Willis Reed (12)
| Walt Frazier (4)
| Madison Square Garden19,500
| 3–4
|-

Player statistics

Season

Playoffs

Awards and records
Willis Reed, All-NBA Second Team
Walt Frazier, All-NBA Second Team
Dave DeBusschere, NBA All-Defensive First Team
Walt Frazier, NBA All-Defensive First Team

References

New York
New York Knicks seasons
New York Knicks
New York Knicks
1970s in Manhattan
Madison Square Garden